The Landesliga Niederrhein is the second highest amateur football league in the Lower Rhine region which is part of the state of North Rhine-Westphalia and since 2012 the sixth tier of the German football league system. It operates in two groups which run parallel below the Oberliga Niederrhein. Until the introduction of the 3. Liga in 2008 it was the sixth tier of the league system; until the introduction of the Regionalligas in 1994 the fifth tier.

History
The league was founded in 1947 as the highest division for the area covered by the Lower Rhine football association. In 1949 it became a second tier to the 2. Oberliga West and was reduced to two divisions until 1952, when the three-division system was restored. In 1956 it dropped to the third tier after Verbandsliga Niederrhein was founded. The league still remained as feeder to the Verbandsliga with the replacement of the 2. Oberliga West by the old Regionalliga West in 1963. In turn the Regionalliga was replaced by 2. Bundesliga Nord in 1974. In 1978 it was slipped to the fourth tier under Oberliga Nordrhein; in 1994 it was the fifth under the current Regionalliga West, and in 2008 was the sixth under the NRW-Liga which took over after Oberliga was abolished.

In the German football league system, the Landesliga was first established as second-rate below the Oberliga West and it later slipped five times down to the seventh level by the introduction of the aforementioned higher leagues. Since the league structural reform of 2012 and the related dissolution of the NRW-Liga in favor of the Oberliga Niederrhein, however, the league moved up from the seventh to the sixth level.

Modus
For five seasons since 2015-16, the Landesliga Niederrhein has consisted of two groups of 16 to 18 clubs each. The exact number of teams is carried out every year on a geographical basis.

The champions of each group are promoted to the Oberliga Niederrhein, provided they are senior clubs or are financially efficient. Should a winner or both winners be deemed ineligible (if reserve teams) or refuse promotion for any reason, the next best-placed teams in their groups may be promoted. The runner-up in each group may playoff for promotion. The number of promotions to the Oberliga depend on the number of relegations and promotions in that league. Teams ranked 16th and below are relegated to their respective Bezirksliga and are replaced by the champions from each Bezirksliga. In the two groups, the 15th placed teams play each other for relegation. A reserve team is also relegated if its senior team drops down to the Landesliga.

For 2020–21, the Landesliga expanded to 43 clubs and reverted to three groups of 14 to 15 teams each due to the cancellation of the preceding season.

League champions
The league champions of the divisions:

References

External links
Official website of the Lower Rhine Football Association

Landesliga
Football competitions in North Rhine-Westphalia
Sports leagues established in 1947
1947 establishments in Germany